Nancy Rufina Obregón Peralta (born 6 January 1970) is a Peruvian politician and a Congresswoman representing San Martín for the 2006–2011 term. Obregón belongs to the Union for Peru party.

Obregón is affiliated with the cocalero movement. She was arrested in Peru, ostensibly for cocalero activism, though this is disputed and political motives are indicated. In particular, her support for the popular Ollanta Humala may have been a factor in her arrest. Her political party, however, completely dropped its support for Obregón as further alleged evidence of her involvement with a drug cartel and criminal activities emerged. If found guilty, the ex-congresswoman will spend several years in prison.

References

External links 
Official Congressional Site

1970 births
Living people
Cocalero activists
Union for Peru politicians
Members of the Congress of the Republic of Peru
21st-century Peruvian women politicians
21st-century Peruvian politicians
Women members of the Congress of the Republic of Peru